= Historical population of Banja Luka =

The ethnic composition of the Banja Luka municipality. Serbs Croats No clear majority (Serbs, Croats, Muslims (Bosniaks), Yugoslavs) Uninhabited or no data

This article presents information about the historical population of Banja Luka.

== Population growth ==
Note: The population figures for 1969 and onwards are for the entire Banja Luka metropolitan area.

Year	Population
1895	13,566
1939	32,000
1971	158,736
1981	183,618
1991	195,139
1999	220,000
2004	222,000

== Historical data ==
- 1879. Banja Luka district: Population 86209, Orthodox 64 186, Muslims 12 350, Catholics 9 486, Jews 187.
- 1879. Town Banja Luka, Population 9 560, Muslims 6 474, Orthodox 1 893, Catholics 1 006, Jews 187.
- 1910. Banja Luka, city (48 km²): Overall population 14800, Orthodox 3 694, Muslims 6 588, Catholics 3 930.
- 1910. Banja Luka, village district (1 614 km²): Overall 58 360, orthodox 41 414, Muslims 2 436, Catholics 14 052.
- 1921. Banja Luka, city: Overall: 18 001, orthodox: 5 324, Catholics: 4 718, Muslims: 7 201, Jews: 484.
- 1921. Banja Luka, district: Overall: 59 578, orthodox: 41 511, Catholics: 15 159, Muslims: 2 364, Jews: 1.
- 1948. Banja Luka, city: Overall: 31 223, Serbs: 10 861 (34, 78%), Croatian: 8 662, Muslims: 9 951.
- 1948. Banja Luka, canton: Overall: 89 248, Serbs: 64 599, Croats: 21 150, Muslims: 2 622.
- 1971. Municipally of Banja Luka: Overall: 158 736, Serbs 92 465, Croats 33 371, Muslims 24 268, Yugoslav 4 684.
- 1981. Municipally of Banja Luka: Overall: 183 618, Serbs 93 389, Yugoslav 31 347, Croats 30 442, Muslims 21 726...
- 1981. City of Banja Luka: Overall: 123 937, Serbs: 51 839, Yugoslavs 29 176, Muslims 20 916, Croats 16 314.
- 1991. Municipally of Banja Luka: Overall: 195 692, Serbs: 106 826 (54, 58%), Croats 29 026, Muslims 28 558, Yugoslavs 23 656.
- 1991. City of Banja Luka: Overall 143 079, Serbs 70 155, Muslims 27 689, Yugoslavs 22 645, Croats 15 700.

== Percentage breakdown ==
City of Banja Luka

Bosnian Muslim (from 1994 Bosniaks)

- 1879 – 67.72%
- 1910 – 44.51%
- 1921 – 40.00%
- 1948 – 31.87%
- 1981 – 16.88%
- 1991 – 19.35%

Serbs (from 1948 Serbs)

- 1879 – 19.80%
- 1910 – 24.96%
- 1921 – 29.58%
- 1948 – 34.78%
- 1981 – 41.83%
- 1991 – 49.03%

Catholics (from 1948 Croats)

- 1879 – 11.00%
- 1910 – 26.55%
- 1921 – 26.21%
- 1948 – 27.74%
- 1981 – 16.58%
- 1991 – 13.16%

Yugoslavs

- 1981 – 23.54%
- 1991 – 15.82%

Municipality of Banja Luka

Bosnian Muslim (from 1994 Bosniaks)

- 1879 – 14.33%
- 1910 – 4.17%
- 1921 – 3.97%
- 1948 – 2.93%
- 1971 – 15.29%
- 1981 – 11.83%
- 1991 – 14.59%

Orthodox Serbs

- 1879 – 74.45%
- 1910 – 70.96%
- 1921 – 69.68%
- 1948 – 72.38%
- 1971 – 58.25%
- 1981 – 50.86%
- 1991 – 54.58%

Catholics (from 1948 Croats)

- 1879 – 10.52%
- 1910 – 26.55%
- 1921 – 25.44%
- 1948 – 23.70%
- 1971 – 21.02%
- 1981 – 16.58%
- 1991 – 14.83%

Yugoslavs

- 1971 – 2.95%
- 1981 – 17.07%
- 1991 – 12.09%

== Analysis ==
Banja Luka is the second largest city in Bosnia and Herzegovina, which traces permanent human settlement back to the Neolithic age. The city primarily consists of those who are either Bosnian, Serbian, or Croatian. Generally speaking, the population of those of the Bosnian nationality has fluctuated over the years. There was a sharp decline in the population of the Bosnian in Banja Luka from 1879 to 1991, while there was a sharp and consistent increase in the Serbian population in the city in that time frame. Meanwhile, the population of those who were Croatian remained relatively the same in Banja Luka over the years, with a gradual decline starting after WII.

On the municipal level numbers tend to stay relatively the same. It is noted that the Serbian population has declined due to some of the rural parts that were included in the city, and the in-migration that occurred after the 1969 earthquake. There was a sharp drop in the Bosniak population on the municipal level in 1910, which can be attributed to massive emigration (partly due to Agrarian Reform), and the fact that many Bosnian peoples had to declare themselves as Croats, Serbs or undecided Muslims until 1971 when their historical ethnic name was returned.

== See also ==
- Croatia
- Bosnia and Herzegovina
- Banja Luka
